Pyotr Mikhailovich Vlasov was a Russian ambassador to Persia, serving from 1902 to 1903.

Diplomats of the Russian Empire
Year of death missing
20th-century Russian people
Year of birth missing
Ambassadors of the Russian Empire to Iran